Daniel Muñoz de la Nava was the defending champion, but decided not to defend his title.

Jozef Kovalík won the title, defeating Arthur De Greef 6–3, 6–2 in the final.

Seeds

Draw

Finals

Top half

Bottom half

References
 Main Draw
 Qualifying Draw

Capri Watch Cup - Singles
Tennis Napoli Cup